Stadio Alfredo Viviani is a multi-use stadium in Potenza, Italy.  It is currently used mostly for football matches and is the home ground of Potenza Calcio. The stadium holds 6,000 people.

Notable events 

Alfredo Viviani
Potenza S.C.
Potenza Calcio
Sports venues in Basilicata
Buildings and structures in the Province of Potenza